Nazzar Al-Jamali (born 1939) is an Iraqi hurdler. He competed in the men's 110 metres hurdles and Men's 400 metres hurdles at the 1960 Summer Olympics.

References

External links
 

1939 births
Living people
Athletes (track and field) at the 1960 Summer Olympics
Iraqi male hurdlers
Olympic athletes of Iraq
Place of birth missing (living people)